The 2019–20 season is Yuen Long's 26th season in the top-tier division in Hong Kong football. Yuen Long will compete in the Premier League, Senior Challenge Shield, FA Cup and Sapling Cup this season. However, due to the 2020 coronavirus pandemic in Hong Kong, Yuen Long announced their withdrawal from the remaining matches this season in April 2020. On 12 June 2020, Yuen Long confirmed their withdrawal from participating in the new HKPL season.

Squad

First Team
As of 12 March 2020

 (on loan from Kitchee)

 (on loan from Eastern)
 FP
 FP
 FP
 FP

 (on loan from Eastern)

 FP (on loan from Pegasus)
 (on loan from Eastern)

 

Remarks:
LP These players are registered as local players in Hong Kong domestic football competitions.
FP These players are registered as foreign players.

Transfers

Transfers in

Transfers out

Loans In

Loans Out

Team staff

Competitions

Hong Kong Premier League

Table

Hong Kong Senior Challenge Shield

Hong Kong Sapling Cup

Group stage

Hong Kong FA Cup

Remarks

References

Hong Kong football clubs 2019–20 season